Michele Troiano (born 7 January 1985) is an Italian former professional footballer who played as a midfielder.

Club career
Troiano started his career at native club Monza. He then joined Modena F.C. in Serie B. In January 2007, then Serie A team Chievo signed Troiano in a co-ownership deal, exchanged with Salvatore Bruno.

On 3 March 2007 Troiano played his first Serie A match for Chievo against A.C. Milan.

In June 2008, Modena bought him back and bought Bruno outright, in exchange, Angelo Antonazzo and Nicholas Frey went to Chievo.

On 28 October 2020, Troiano played his first match for Juventus U23 in a 2–1 defeat against Como. On 2 May 2021, he scored his first goal for Juventus U23 in a 3–2 defeat against Piacenza. On 13 August, Troiano announced his retirement from football.

International career
Troiano was capped for the Italy under-20 side in the 2005 FIFA World Youth Championship.

References

External links
 FIGC 
 http://www.gazzetta.it/Speciali/serie_a_2007/giocatori/troiano_mic.shtml
 http://www.gazzetta.it/speciali/serie_b/2008_nw/giocatori/80469.shtml
 

1985 births
Living people
People from Desio
Italian footballers
Italy youth international footballers
A.C. Monza players
Modena F.C. players
A.C. ChievoVerona players
U.S. Sassuolo Calcio players
Virtus Entella players
Ascoli Calcio 1898 F.C. players
Juventus Next Gen players
Serie A players
Serie B players
Serie C players
Association football midfielders
Footballers from Lombardy
Sportspeople from the Province of Monza e Brianza